Sangadi is a large village of Sakoli Taluka in Bhandara district of Maharashtra, India. It is situated along National Highway NH-353C.

History

Demographics

References 

Bhandara district
Villages in Bhandara district